Kouy Valiasr is a wealthy district located in the eastern part of Tabriz, Iran.

References 
 https://web.archive.org/web/20120226205859/http://www.eachto.ir/

External links 
 Virtual Museum of Historical Buildings of Tabriz (School of Architecture, Tabriz Islamic Art University).
 Iranian Student's Tourism & Traveling Agency, ISTTA. (English), (Persian)

Districts of Tabriz